"Purple Pills", also known as "Purple Hills" in the radio edit, is a song by American hip hop group D12, taken as the second cut from their debut studio album, Devil's Night. It achieved notable success, reaching number 19 on the Billboard Hot 100, number two in United Kingdom, Ireland, and Norway, and the top 10 in Australia, Finland, Flanders, Netherlands, and Sweden.

Background
The track features verses rapped by Eminem, Bizarre, Proof, Swifty and a joint verse between Kuniva and Kon Artis. The album version of the song contains many references to drug use, with "purple pills", "golden seals", and "Mushroom Mountain" being examples of recreational drug use. When it was announced that the group intended to release the track as a single, due to the drug and sex references, it was deemed inappropriate for play on many radio stations, and as such, a censored version of the song, "Purple Hills", was made. This version removes most of the drug and sex references and replaces them with comical lyrics. Such changes include the line "I've been to mushroom mountain" altered to say "I've climbed the highest mountain"; and the line "I take a couple uppers, I down a couple downers" changed to "I've been so many places, I've seen so many faces." Most of Bizarre's verse is entirely changed, due to the strong amount of sexual and drug content in it. Music videos were made for both "Purple Pills" and "Purple Hills" respectively. The accompanying music videos were directed by Joseph Kahn.

Release
In the United States and United Kingdom, radio play was limited to "Purple Hills", as "Purple Pills" was deemed not suitable for radio. However, a number of underground radio stations in the United States played "Purple Pills". Music channels were also restricted to playing the video for "Purple Hills". When physically released, two versions of the single were made available in the United Kingdom — one for "Purple Pills", with the "Purple Pills" audio track and music video, and one for "Purple Hills", with the "Purple Hills" audio track and music video. In Europe and Australia, one version of the single was available—this contained "Purple Pills" as an audio track but the music video for "Purple Hills". In America, one version of the single was available — this contained "Purple Hills" as an audio track with no enhanced section.

Track listings

Notes
 signifies an additional producer.
 signifies a co-producer.

Charts

Weekly charts

Year-end charts

Certifications

Release history

References

2000 songs
2001 singles
Comedy rap songs
D12 songs
Interscope Records singles
Music videos directed by Joseph Kahn
Shady Records singles
Song recordings produced by Eminem
Songs about drugs
Songs written by Eminem
Songs written by Denaun Porter
Songs written by Bizarre (rapper)
Songs written by Jeff Bass